Black Market Activities (BMA) is an American independent record label that was founded in 2003 by Guy Kozowyk, the frontman of the Boston, Massachusetts-based extreme metal band the Red Chord.

History
Black Market Activities was started with the stated goal of releasing records by bands that are pushing the boundaries of extreme music while keeping a friendly artist-centered attitude that steers clear of a lot of the "major label" business-like dealings that tend to hurt and exploit bands. The founder of the label being an extreme musician himself, he can more easily relate to the issues that are important to the bands on the label, and attempts to balance the business and art aspects of the music world. BMA is a tight-knit group of bands and friends who share similar ideas and musical tastes.

In the years since its creation, BMA has grown quickly and gained much recognition. Black Market Activities teamed up with long-running metal record label Metal Blade Records on a production and distribution deal which allows all BMA releases to reach the same major stores as Metal Blade releases. This has propelled BMA and all its bands forward quite a bit. It has also, however, lead to some confusion as to which bands are on BMA and which bands are on Metal Blade, as both record labels' logos now appear on the backs of all BMA recordings.

Artists

Current artists
 The Abominable Iron Sloth
 Architect
 Behold... The Arctopus
 Bird Eater
 Dance Club Massacre
 Destroy Destroy Destroy
 Ed Gein
 Engineer
 Fit for an Autopsy
 Khann
 Lords
 Lye By Mistake
 the_Network
 Romans
 Stomach Earth
 Sweet Cobra
 Today Is the Day

Past artists
 Animosity (disbanded in 2009)
 Backstabbers Incorporated (inactive since 2008)
 Beyond the Sixth Seal (now on Metal Blade)
 Born From Pain (now on Metal Blade)
 Cancer Bats (now on Distort Entertainment)
 Deadwater Drowning (disbanded in 2004)
 Found Dead Hanging (changed name to Architect)
 From A Second Story Window (disbanded in 2008)
 Gaza (disbanded in 2013)
 Lamb Of God (now on Epic and Roadrunner)
 Paria (disbanded in 2010)
 Premonitions of War (now on Victory)
 Psyopus (disbanded in 2012)
 The Red Chord (now on Metal Blade)
 Sleep Terror (inactive)
 The Tony Danza Tapdance Extravaganza (disbanded in 2012)

Discography

See also 
 List of record labels
 Metal Blade Records

References

External links 
Black Market Activities at Discogs
 Metal Blade Records official website

American independent record labels
Heavy metal record labels
Record labels established in 2003